Devil Canyon, is a steep sided valley or canyon in the south side of Paivia Peak, in the San Bernardino Mountains of San Bernardino County, California.  Devil Canyon Creek with its tributary East and West Forks, are a tributary of the Santa Ana River watershed, now interrupted by the local irrigation and flood control system reservoir at its mouth.

References

Santa Ana River
Landforms of San Bernardino County, California
Canyons and gorges of California
Rivers of San Bernardino County, California
San Bernardino Mountains
Rivers of Southern California